The fourth season of Portlandia premiered on IFC in the United States on February 27 and concluded on May 1, 2014 with a total of 10 episodes.

Cast

Main cast
 Fred Armisen
 Carrie Brownstein

Special guest cast
 Kyle MacLachlan as Mr. Mayor

Guest stars

Episodes

References

External links 

Ultimate Character and Episode Guide
 

Portlandia (TV series)
2014 American television seasons